Vallur Thermal Power Station is a power plant located in Athipattu Pudunagar, Vallur in Thiruvallur district, North Chennai, India. The power plant is operated by NTPC Tamil Nadu Energy Company Limited, a joint venture between NTPC Limited and TANGEDCO and has three units with 500 MW each.

In January 2014, the units in the power plant achieved a record generation of 24.09 million units (kWh) of electricity. The project adds nearly 24 million units a day to the grid. Tamil Nadu is the major beneficiary of power generated from this facility (about 750 MW), while some of it is supplied to Andhra Pradesh, Karnataka, Kerala, and Puducherry.

The plant will consume  of coal a year. Coal for the plant will be brought from Orissa through ship to Ennore Port, from where it will be transported by pipe conveyor crossing Ennore Creek.

Location
The power plant is located on a triangular tract of land between Ennore Creek and Athipattu Pudhunagar railway station, southwest of Ennore Port, Chennai.

Construction
The plant was established under the mega power project policy. The erstwhile Tamil Nadu Electricity Board (TNEB) and the NTPC, in a joint venture, formed the NTPC Tamil Nadu Energy Company Limited. The foundation stone for the Vallur thermal plant was laid on 5 September 2007, with an estimated cost of 80 billion (€100 million), and the 19,900-million main plant package to supply steam generators and turbine for stage I was awarded to Bharat Heavy Electricals Limited (BHEL), a state-run power equipments manufacturer, on 13 August 2007. The projected was constructed in two phases: phase I with two 500 MW units at a cost of 54 billion and phase II with one 500 MW unit at a cost of 30 billion. Initially expected to be operational by 2010, the project was delayed due to the late implementation of the coal-handling facility established by the BHEL. Erection of the boiler column began on 5 January 2009.

In September 2009, the 130 million contract to supply units for Vallur was given to BHEL, which supplied and installed steam generator and steam turbine packages. BHEL was responsible for the design, engineering manufacture, supply, erection and commissioning of the steam generators, turbine generators, electrostatic precipitators and associated auxiliaries, and controls and instrumentation systems in the plant.

The  boiler drum of Unit I was erected in June 2010. Unit I was commissioned in March 2012 but operating at full capacity was delayed further due to problems with coal-handling facilities. Independent works on phase II began in 2010.

The first, second and third units were synchronised with the grid on 9 March 2012, 26 February 2013 and 28 February 2014, respectively. The total cost of the project without IDC was 91,930 million. The plant commenced its commercial operation on 29 November 2012, with the operation of its first unit. The second unit commenced its commercial operations on 25 August 2013, while that of the third unit was commenced on 28 February 2014.

Cost and Finance
The cost of phase I was 54 billion ($1.15 billion) and that of phase II was 30 billion ($639 million). The debt equity ratio of the project is 7:3. The Rural Electrification Corporation (REC) sanctioned 38 billion ($809 million) to meet the entire debt portion of the project. REC advanced a loan of 21 billion ($447 million) for the second phase in April 2010.

Technology and operations
The boiler systems at the plant consists of single- or two-pass type, with front/rear/side mill layout, which can have single/bi-drum arrangement with natural or controlled circulation. There is constant or sliding pressure operation, and hot or cold primary air systems. Steam turbine operates at a speeds of 3,000 rpm.

The IDCTs use seawater, which is drawn from the intake channel of North Chennai Thermal Power Station, and fresh water requirement is met from a desalination plant. The plant has adopted closed cycle re-circulating type cooling water system for its operations.

The plant requires  of coal per day. Domestic coalfields supply 53 percent of the need, and the remainder through coal imports.

Installed capacity
Following is the unit-wise capacity of the  plant.

The share of Tamil Nadu would be  from each of the three units in the plant.

Environmental Impact

The Vallur Thermal Power Station is environmentally friendly & non-polluting plant.

See also

 List of power stations in India

References

External links
 Vallur Thermal Power Project on TANGEDCO website
 Page in Global Energy Observatory

Coal-fired power stations in Tamil Nadu
Tiruvallur district
Power plants in Chennai
Energy infrastructure completed in 2010
2010 establishments in Tamil Nadu